CAPOX (also called XELOX) is a chemotherapy regimen consisting of capecitabine (trade name Xeloda) combined with oxaliplatin.

Xelox regime operates in 3-week cycles, usually with 8 cycles in total; Xeloda is orally taken for twice daily for two weeks, while oxaliplatin is administrated by IV on the first day of the cycle; there is a one-week rest period before the next cycle.

Adverse effects
Neuropathy
Diarrhea

References

Chemotherapy regimens used in colorectal cancer